Brigid Hogan-O'Higgins (10 March 1932 – 2 November 2022) was an Irish Fine Gael politician who served as a Teachta Dála (TD) from 1957 to 1977. She was the first woman to represent County Galway in Dáil Eireann.

Biography
Brigid Hogan was the daughter of Patrick Hogan, who died when she was 4 years old. He had been the Minister for Agriculture from 1922 to 1932. 

At the age of 24, she was elected as a Fine Gael TD for the Galway South constituency at the 1957 general election. In doing so, she became the first woman to represent Galway in the Dáil. One year later she married fellow TD Michael O'Higgins and in doing so together they became the first married couple to serve in the Dáil together simultaneously. 

Hogan-O'Higgins was re-elected at the 1961 general election for the Galway East constituency and again at the 1965 general election. After boundary changes, she was elected at the 1969 general election for Clare–South Galway, where she was returned for a fifth and final term at the 1973 general election.

Hogan-O'Higgins' years as a deputy were mostly spent in opposition: Fianna Fáil was in power continuously from 1957 to 1973, and it was only in her last term (in the 20th Dáil) that Fine Gael formed a government. She was the Fine Gael spokeswoman on Posts and Telegraphs from 1969 to 1972. She was defeated at the 1977 general election, when Jack Lynch led Fianna Fáil's return to government with a large majority.

Hogan-O'Higgins' husband, Michael O'Higgins, was also a TD, as were his father, uncle, and brother. Brigid and Michael had nine children. She was the last surviving member of the 16th Dáil.

Hogan-O'Higgins died in Galway on 2 November 2022, at the age of 90. Commenting on her death, the President of Ireland Michael D. Higgins stated she had made a "significant contribution to Irish politics" and recalled that "Both Brigid and [her husband] Michael were always courteous in respecting the views of others, while themselves offering their views with sincerity and consideration."

See also
Families in the Oireachtas

References

1932 births
2022 deaths
Fine Gael TDs
Members of the 16th Dáil
Members of the 17th Dáil
Members of the 18th Dáil
Members of the 19th Dáil
Members of the 20th Dáil
20th-century women Teachtaí Dála
Politicians from County Galway
Spouses of Irish politicians